PQ Monthly was a free, advertising-supported, monthly LGBTQ newspaper and online publication for Oregon and southwest Washington and, briefly, Seattle, published in Portland, Oregon, United States. The last print issue was released in December 2017.

The owner and publisher of El Hispanic News, and co-founder, with partner Gabriela Kandziora, of Dykes On Bikes in Portland, Melanie Davis, announced plans to start publishing PQ Monthly soon after Just Out, Portland's semi-monthly LGBTQ newspaper in print since 1983,
announced that it was out of business, in December 2011.

References

External links 
 

2012 establishments in Oregon
2017 disestablishments in Oregon
LGBT-related magazines published in the United States
Monthly magazines published in the United States
Online magazines published in the United States
Defunct magazines published in the United States
Free magazines
LGBT in Oregon
LGBT culture in Portland, Oregon
Magazines established in 2012
Magazines disestablished in 2017
Magazines published in Portland, Oregon